Rachel Hadas (born November 8, 1948) is an American poet, teacher, essayist, and translator. Her most recent essay collection is Piece by Piece: Selected Prose (Paul Dry Books, 2021), and her most recent poetry collection is Love and Dread (Measure Press Inc., 2021). Her honors include a Guggenheim Fellowship, Ingram Merrill Foundation Grants, the O.B. Hardison Award from the Folger Shakespeare Library, and an Award in Literature from the American Academy and Institute of Arts and Letters.

Biography
The daughter of noted Columbia University classicist Moses Hadas and Latin teacher Elizabeth Chamberlayne Hadas, Hadas grew up in Morningside Heights, New York City. She received a baccalaureate at Radcliffe College in classics, a Master of Arts (1977) at Johns Hopkins University in poetry, and a doctorate at Princeton University in comparative literature (1982). Marrying a man from the island of Samos and living in Greece after her undergraduate work at Radcliffe, Hadas became an intimate of poets James Merrill and Alan Ansen, both of whom strongly influenced her early work, as did Cavafy, whose work she translated, and Seferis.

She is often associated with the New Formalism school of poetry, and her work was included in landmark collections of New Formalism including Rebel Angels and A Formal Feeling Comes. Her subject matter ranges from her roots in the classics through the intimately personal, with memory a recurring theme throughout her work.

During the height of the AIDS crisis, she led poetry workshops for those afflicted, and edited a number of their works with Charles Barber, experiences that informed her subsequent work. Her translations of writers including Tibullus, Charles Baudelaire, and the Greek poet Konstantinos Karyotakis, have been published to much acclaim. She has taught English at the Newark campus of Rutgers University since 1981, where, as of 2006, she is the Board of Governors Professor of English. Hadas will be teaching at the Poetry Seminar at The Frost Place in August, 2021. Hadas lives in New York City and Vermont and is married to the visual artist Shalom Gorewitz. She was married to composer George Edwards until his death in 2011. Hadas has a son, Jonathan Hadas Edwards (born 1984).

Bibliography

Poetry
Broadsides
 

Collections

 Questions in the Vestibule: Poems, Northwestern University Press, 2016, 
 
 The Ache of Appetite, Copper Beech Press, 2010, 
 River of Forgetfulness, David Robert Books, 2006, ; (WordTech Communications, 2006)
 Laws, University of Nebraska Press, 2004), 
 
 
 
 The Double Legacy: Reflections on a Pair of Deaths (Faber & Faber, 1995)
 
 Mirrors of Astonishment (Rutgers University Press, 1992)
 Living in Time (Rutgers University Press, 1990)
 Pass It On, Princeton University Press, 1989, 
 
 Slow Transparency (Wesleyan University Press, 1983)

Chapbooks
 Starting from Troy (David R. Godine, 1975)
 "Two Poems" (Dim Gray Bar Press, 2000)

Translations
 Other Worlds Than This (Rutger University Press, 1994)

Anthologies edited
 The Greek Poets: Homer to the Present (W.W. Norton, 2010; Eds., Peter Constantine, Rachel Hadas, Edmund Keeley, Karen Van Dyck)
 Unending Dialogue: Voices from an AIDS Poetry Workshop (Ed. with Charles Barber, Faber & Faber, 1991)

List of poems

Essay collections
 Classics: Essays (Textos Books, 2007)
 Merrill, Cavafy, Poems, and Dreams (University of Michigan Press, 2000)

Memoirs

References

Sources
 Library of Congress Online Catalog > Rachel Hadas

External links
 RachelHadas.com Author Website
 Audio Reading: Rachel Hadas reads from Euripedes' poem Helen
 Audio Reading: Rachel Hadas reads a poem by Sappho
 Contemporary Poetry Review > 2009 > Interview: The CPR Interview: Rachel Hadas

1948 births
Living people
American essayists
American translators
American women essayists
American women poets
Formalist poets
Greek–English translators
Johns Hopkins University alumni
Princeton University alumni
Radcliffe College alumni
Rutgers University faculty
The New Yorker people
Writers from New York (state)
People from Morningside Heights, Manhattan
American women academics
21st-century American women